Below is the list of asteroids that have come close to Earth in 2021.

Timeline of known close approaches less than one lunar distance from Earth 
A list of known near-Earth asteroid close approaches less than 1 lunar distance from Earth in 2021.

Warning times by size 
This sub-section visualises the warning times of the close approaches listed in the above table, depending on the size of the asteroid. It shows the effectiveness of asteroid warning systems at detecting close approaches in 2021. The sizes of the charts show the relative sizes of the asteroids to scale. For comparison, the approximate size of a person is also shown. This is based the absolute magnitude of each asteroid, an approximate measure of size based on brightness.

Absolute magnitude 30 and greater
 (size of a person for comparison)

Absolute magnitude 29-30

Absolute magnitude 28-29

Absolute magnitude 27-28

Absolute magnitude 26-27
(probable size of the Chelyabinsk meteor)

Absolute magnitude 25-26
 
Absolute magnitude less than 25 (largest)

Predicted close approaches 
Below is the list of predicted close approaches of near-Earth asteroids larger than magnitude 27, that were predicted to occur in 2021. This relates to the effectiveness of asteroid cataloging systems at predicting close approaches in 2021.

For asteroids which were observed but not predicted in advance, see the main list above.

Notes

Additional examples 

Below is an example list of near-Earth asteroids that passed or will pass more than 1 lunar distance (384,400 km or 0.00256 AU) from Earth in 2021.

Notes

See also 
List of asteroid close approaches to Earth
List of asteroid close approaches to Earth in 2020
List of asteroid close approaches to Earth in 2022
Asteroid impact prediction

References 

close approaches to Earth in 2021
Near-Earth asteroids